"Even So Come" is a worship song released by Passion as the lead single from their 2015 live album, Passion: Even So Come, on April 28, 2015. It features guest vocals from American Christian music singers Chris Tomlin on the album version and Kristian Stanfill on the radio single version. The song peaked at No. 7 on the Christian Songs Billboard chart and appeared on No. 14 on the year end Christian Songs chart. The song was also featured on the Worship Leader's Top 20 Songs of 2015 list, reaching No. 5 on the list. The radio version appeared on WOW Hits 2016.

Track listing
Digital download
"Even So Come (Live) [feat. Chris Tomlin]" – 7:19
Digital download (radio version)
"Even So Come (Radio Version/Live)" – 4:14

Charts

Weekly charts

Year-end charts

Certifications

References 

2015 singles
2015 songs
Passion Conferences songs
Songs written by Jess Cates
Songs written by Chris Tomlin
Songs written by Jason Ingram